The Nepal Super League is Nepal's first professional franchise based football league organised by Nepal Sports and Events Management (NSEM) in technical support with ANFA.

A total of seven franchises participated in the first tournament which was held at Dasharath Rangasala Stadium from 24 April to 15 May 2021.

Teams

Organisation                                        
The league is organised by Nepal Sports and Event Management under the technical support of All Nepal Football Association (ANFA).

Stadiums 

All matches are held at the Dasarath Rangasala in Kathmandu, Nepal.

Champions 
Kathmandu Rayzrs FC won the first season in 2021.

References 

 
1
2021 establishments in Nepal
Sports leagues established in 2021